Charlize Theron is a South African-American actress who made her film debut in an uncredited role as a follower of a cult in the 1995 horror film Children of the Corn III: Urban Harvest. Theron followed this with appearances as a hitman’s girlfriend in 2 Days in the Valley, a waitress in the romantic comedy Trial and Error (1997), and a woman plagued with demonic visions in the mystery thriller The Devil's Advocate (1997) with Keanu Reeves and Al Pacino. She appeared in the science fiction thriller The Astronaut's Wife with Johnny Depp, and Lasse Hallström's The Cider House Rules (both in 1999). For her portrayal of serial killer Aileen Wuornos in the crime drama Monster (2003), Theron received the Academy Award for Best Actress, the Golden Globe Award for Best Actress in a Motion Picture – Drama, and the Screen Actors Guild Award for Outstanding Performance by a Female Actor in a Leading Role. The following year, she played Swedish entertainer Britt Ekland in the biographical film The Life and Death of Peter Sellers.

Theron played the eponymous rebel assassin in the science fiction action film Æon Flux, and a miner fighting sexual harassment in the drama North Country (both in 2005). The latter role earned her a nomination for Best Actress at the Academy Awards and the BAFTAs. In the same year, she voiced Æon Flux in the tie-in video game adaptation to the film for which she received the Best Performance by a Female award at the Spike Video Game Awards.  Three years later, Theron starred in the superhero film Hancock with Will Smith. The film grossed over $624 million at the worldwide box office. She received a nomination for the Golden Globe Award for Best Actress – Motion Picture Comedy or Musical for her role as an alcoholic writer in the comedy-drama Young Adult (2011). The following year, Theron appeared in the action adventure film Snow White and the Huntsman and Ridley Scott's science fiction film Prometheus. In 2015, she played rebel soldier Imperator Furiosa in George Miller's Mad Max: Fury Road. Two years later, Theron appeared as a cyberterrorist in the action film The Fate of the Furious, which grossed over $1 billion at the worldwide box office—her highest grossing as of May 2017. Theron followed this with acclaimed performances in the comedy-drama Tully (2018), the romantic comedy Long Shot (2019), and the biographical drama Bombshell (2019), the lattermost of which earned her a third Academy Award nomination.

Filmography

Television

Music videos

Video games

Web

References

External links
 

Actress filmographies
American filmographies
Charlize Theron